Hannibal King is a character appearing in American comic books published by Marvel Comics. He first appeared as a supporting character in the title The Tomb of Dracula, issue #25 (Oct. 1974).

King was played by Ryan Reynolds in the 2004 film Blade: Trinity.

Fictional character biography
Hannibal King was born in Milwaukee, Wisconsin. Working as a private detective, King was bitten and killed by Deacon Frost while on a case in London, England. Horrified to find himself one of the undead, King vowed never to consummate the curse by passing it on. He subsists on blood purchased or stolen from blood banks and consumes only corpses or animals. For the most part, eschewing his vampirism, King continues to operate as a private detective, travelling freely only by night.

King was introduced when he was seen confronting Dracula, the lord of Earth's vampires. While searching for Frost, King eventually met Blade, the vampire hunter, whose mother had been killed by Frost, and together they destroy Frost.

While investigating a friend's murder by worshipers of the occult book Darkhold, King contacts Doctor Strange. Learning the book contains spells to create and destroy vampires, King goes with Strange, Blade and Frank Drake to Castle Mordo in Transylvania to retrieve it. They battle Dracula and the Darkholders and use the book to cast the Montesi Formula, which destroys Dracula and all other current vampires on Earth and prevents others from existing on the planet. While King is not destroyed, because he had never taken blood from a living human being, Strange still needed to give King a complete blood transfusion, which restores King to human form.

King, Drake and Blade establish a detective agency. They eventually named it Borderline Investigations. Strange manipulates them into combating the supernatural enemies that are emerging as the Montesi Formula weakens. Later, Strange examines King and concludes King had become a "neo-vampire", a special type with the same abilities and weaknesses of any yet merely craving blood and not needing it to survive In a climactic battle with a one-time vampire king named Varnae, King and Drake are thought to have been killed, but both survived. Blade later finds King in New Orleans, where they team to fight the resurrected Frost. Later, in a two-issue solo series in the comic book Journey Into Mystery, King sets up shop in San Francisco, where CIA Agent Tatjana Stiles enlists him to help stop a vampire plot to blackmail the Earth with biochemical weapons. Stiles becomes critically injured, and King gives in to her plea to be saved via becoming a vampire. When he learns she has become a deadly vampire CIA agent, he becomes dispirited, losing interest in his work and retreating into depression.

Later, Blade's father Lucas Cross offers a way to restore vampires' souls at the cost of removing vampires' strengths. Blade is against this while King is for it, leading the two allies to fight. Blade stakes King, who appears to die,  but he quickly returns, and Blade gives him a potion that stops his need to consume blood.

Powers and abilities
Hannibal King was once a vampire but was cured. He has retained many of his vampiric abilities. He possesses superhuman speed, strength, and senses. He can withstand and recover from severe physical injury and is nearly ageless, impervious to diseases and poisons, and virtually immortal. He can also instantly hypnotize human victims and fly via directed motion hovering by taking on a mist-like form. He can control rats and uses them to gather information for him during the day. He can also transform into a wolf. 

Hannibal also has the weaknesses of a vampire: the need for blood to sustain his existence, the inability to endure direct sunlight, and the standard vampiric vulnerabilities to garlic, silver, and the presence of religious symbols. Beheading, burning, and a wooden stake through the heart would kill him.

Hannibal is an excellent detective, a good marksman with a pistol, and possesses an extraordinary sense of will. He often arms himself with conventional firearms but sometimes uses special ones against supernatural foes.

Vampirism
In the first appearance of Hannibal King (The Tomb of Dracula #25) and during the events of Doctor Strange (volume 2) #59-62, King states that he had been a vampire for about five years. During the events in Journey into Mystery #520-521, King reveals that he had been a vampire for nearly five decades, indicating that he had been a vampire since around the late 1940s. He has openly stated the first figure to others; King declared the latter figure of five decades only in narration.

In The Tomb of Dracula #25, the reader is not immediately told that Hannibal is a vampire until the final panel.

It was stated in Nightstalkers #1 (Aug. 1992) that King's neo-vampire status (craving blood but not needing it to survive, as well as his limited ability to tolerate sunlight) was because he never directly consumes blood from a living human, which is also how he stays the Montesi Formula. However, this neo-vampire condition was never alluded to again after his seeming death in Nightstalkers #18 (April 1994). After that, he was shown to be a regular vampire with all of the traditional strengths and weaknesses, identical to his status before the Montesi Formula was cast.

In other media

Hannibal King appears in Blade: Trinity, portrayed by Ryan Reynolds. This version is a member of a vampire hunting group known as the Nightstalkers allied with Blade and led by Abigail Whistler, a character created for the film and based on a recurring character from the film franchise. The film includes the premise that King is a former vampire, having been turned by Danica Talos, and cured by the retrovirus serum that was developed in the first Blade film.

Reynolds has said that his performance reminded a rival executive of Marvel antihero Deadpool. The exec is said to have told Reynolds, "Trust me, if they ever make a movie about Deadpool, you're the only guy who can play Deadpool," and sent Reynolds a copy of the comic, Cable & Deadpool #2, in which Deadpool refers to his own scarred appearance as "Ryan Reynolds crossed with a Shar-Pei." When Reynolds read that comic that name-dropped him, he fell in love with the character and was driven to bring him to the movies.

Reception
Hannibal King was ranked #25 on a listing of Marvel Comics' monster characters in 2015.

In 2021, Screen Rant included Hannibal King in their "Marvel: 10 Most Powerful Vampires" list.

References

External links
 Hannibal King at Marvel.com

Blade (comics) characters
Characters created by Marv Wolfman
Comics characters introduced in 1974
Fictional characters from Milwaukee
Fictional characters with superhuman senses
Fictional occult and psychic detectives
Fictional private investigators
Fictional vampire hunters
Male horror film characters
Marvel Comics characters who can move at superhuman speeds
Marvel Comics characters with accelerated healing
Marvel Comics characters with superhuman strength
Marvel Comics film characters
Marvel Comics sidekicks
Marvel Comics vampires